Walajapet taluk or Wallajah taluk is a taluk in Ranipet  district of the Indian state of Tamil Nadu. The headquarters of the taluk is the town of Walajapet.

Demographics
According to the 2011 census, the taluk of Wallajah had a population of 440,488 with 219,124  males and 221,364 females. There were 1010 women for every 1000 men. The taluk had a literacy rate of 73.83%. Child population in the age group below 6 years were 23,574 Males and 21,993 Females.

References 

Taluks of Vellore district